Jazmine Fenlator-Victorian (born August 29, 1985) is an American–Jamaican bobsledder who was one of three pilots of the U.S. Olympic Bobsled team for the 2014 Winter Olympics in Sochi before opting to compete for her father's native country of Jamaica from 2016.

Fenlator grew up in Wayne, New Jersey and graduated from Wayne Valley High School. She graduated from Rider University with a bachelor's degree in multimedia communications and advertising. At Rider, she competed on the track and field team specializing in shot put, discus, and hammer. Upon graduating from Rider in 2007, Fenlator's track coach suggested she try a bobsled camp.

After spending a few years as a brakeman, Fenlator decided to switch to the driver's seat. By her third season as a pilot, she had earned two World Cup medals – silver in Lake Placid, N.Y. and bronze in Igls, Austria. She was named as one of three pilots of the U.S. Olympic Bobsled team for the 2014 Winter Olympics in Sochi, Russia.

References

1985 births
Living people
American female bobsledders
Jamaican female bobsledders
American people of Jamaican descent
Bobsledders at the 2014 Winter Olympics
Bobsledders at the 2018 Winter Olympics
Bobsledders at the 2022 Winter Olympics
Olympic bobsledders of the United States
Olympic bobsledders of Jamaica
Sportspeople from Passaic County, New Jersey
People from Wayne, New Jersey
Rider University alumni
Wayne Valley High School alumni
21st-century American women